Elena Patroklou was born in Nicosia in 1968. She began her musical career studying guitar and piano when she was just ten years old. She completed her musical studies in Vienna and Cyprus and received her music diploma in 1989. She represented Cyprus at the Eurovision Song Contest 1991 with a Kypros Charalambous composition entitled SOS finishing ninth place with 60 points.

References

1968 births
Living people
Cypriot pop singers
Eurovision Song Contest entrants for Cyprus
Eurovision Song Contest entrants of 1991